Aunt Clara is a 1954 British comedy film starring Margaret Rutherford as a woman who inherits a number of shady businesses from a relative. Ronald Shiner, A. E. Matthews, and Fay Compton are also featured. The film was based on the 1952 novel of the same name by author Noel Streatfeild, and directed by Anthony Kimmins for London Films. It was shot at Shepperton Studios near London. The film's sets were designed by the art director Paul Sheriff.

Plot
Clara Hilton is a shrewd, but kindly old lady mostly ignored by the rest of her family. When her cantankerous uncle Simon dies, he unexpectedly leaves her the bulk of his considerable estate - his house, six racing greyhounds, a crooked game, a pub and a brothel - because she alone would see to the well-being of those dependent on him. Clara keeps Simon's valet Henry Martin on to assist her.

Henry and Cyril and Maggie Mason, who run the pub, try to keep her from seeing what kind of business they are running, but she quickly finds out. She also discovers that Simon's "natural daughter" Julie Mason, to whom he left £20 a month for life, has disappeared. Clara decides to have her solicitor Charles Willis try to find her, only to discover he met Julie at the funeral and is dining with her that very evening.

Then she learns that Fosdick, the man operating the crooked Gambler's Luck wheel of fortune, will be at Epsom Downs, so she goes to meet him. With the police closing in, Fosdick hastily departs, leaving Clara in charge of the game. She and Henry are taken into custody. Charles clears up the matter.

Next, Alfie and Lily Pearce deceive Clara into believing that the greyhounds they are training for her are champions, the furthest thing from the truth.

When Charles finds out the Masons have not given Julie her monthly allowance, they all go to give the Masons the opportunity to explain themselves. In private, Cyril Mason tells Charles that they kept the money because Julie has no morals. Charles punches him. Later, he and Julie marry.

Clara puts on a fundraiser for a children's holiday fund, but the donations are meagre. Henry unexpectedly presents the patrons the opportunity to play Gambler's Luck. Afterward, Clara gives the game to Fosdick, on the understanding that he send half the winnings to her charity.

At the greyhound races, Alfie substitutes a champion for his perennial loser, but Clara feeds the animal hot dogs beforehand, causing him to fade, and costing Alfie and Henry £25 each, plus a £20 cup. Clara, on the other hand, wins her bet. Later, she reimburses the pair for their losses, and anticipates that Alfie will play fair from now on.

Finally, Clara goes to see brothel-owner Gladys Smith. She and her girls are getting on in years and will not be able to ply their trade for very much longer. Clara reveals that she does not have much longer to live, and they are the last responsibility Uncle Simon left her. After Clara dies, her will leaves the women the house and funds to support them, and the pub goes to Henry.

Cast

 Ronald Shiner as Henry Martin
 Margaret Rutherford as Clara Hilton
 A. E. Matthews as Simon Hilton
 Fay Compton as Gladys Smith
 Nigel Stock as Charles Willis
 Jill Bennett as Julie
 Reginald Beckwith as Alfie Pearce
 Raymond Huntley as Maurice Hilton
 Eddie Byrne as Fosdick
 Sid James as Honest Sid 
 Diana Beaumont as Dorrie
 Garry Marsh as Arthur Cole
 Gillian Lind as Doris Hilton
 Ronald Ward as Cyril Mason
 Eileen Way as Maggie Mason
 Jessie Evans as Lily Pearce
  Jean St. Clair as 	Alice Cole 
 Fanny Rowe as Maggie Mason 
 Stringer Davis as 	Dr. Graham 
Joss Ambler as	Paul Levington 
 Ambrosine Phillpotts as 	Sylvia Levington 
 Vivienne Martin	as 	Maid 
 Bruce Beeby as 	Detective
 Tom Walls Jr. as Bookmaker
 Prince Monolulu as Black Bookmaker 
 Jack McNaughton as 	Coach Driver in Pub
 Charles Lloyd Pack as 	Simon's Doctor 
 Johnnie Schofield as Barman

Reception
'Britmovie' wrote that the film "fails to catch fire despite its undoubted charm. Margaret Rutherford plays the eponymous lead but for once her dotty spinster persona is understated and the film contains a suffocating melancholic tone that only resolves itself at the films moving closure"; while TV Guide observed "a charming film dotted with cameos by noted British comics."

References

External links 
 
 

1954 films
1954 comedy films
British black-and-white films
British comedy films
1950s English-language films
Films based on British novels
Films directed by Anthony Kimmins
Films scored by Benjamin Frankel
Films set in London
Films set in the 1940s
London Films films
British Lion Films films
Films shot at Shepperton Studios
1950s British films